Lys-N is a metalloendopeptidase found in the mushroom Grifola frondosa that cleaves proteins on the amino side of lysine residues.

Mass spectrometry
Lys-N is becoming a popular protease used for protein digestion in proteomics experiments. The combination Lys-N proteolytic peptides and mass spectrometry sequencing with ETD creates tandem mass spectra composed mostly of amino terminal peptide fragment ions.
This fragmentation pattern facilitates the applicability of these spectra for de novo peptide sequencing.

See also
 Endoproteinase Lys-C
 Mass spectrometry
 Tandem mass spectrometry
 Bottom-up proteomics

References

External links 
 The MEROPS online database for peptidases and their inhibitors: M35.004
 Coverage on Genomeweb
 Enzyme entry at SWISS-PROT

Proteomics
Proteases
EC 3.4.24
Fungal proteins